132 may refer to:

132 (number)
AD 132
132 BC
132 (MBTA bus)